Piliaieve is an islet in the Pacific Ocean located in the state of Nui, Tuvalu.

References

External links
Map of Nui showing Piliaieve

Islands of Tuvalu
Nui (atoll)